The Lagos Review is a Nigerian literary magazine based in Lagos. It was founded by Toni Kan and Dami Ajayi in 2019.

History 
The Lagos Review was officially launched in September 2019, founded by Nigerian writer Toni Kan and poet Dami Ajayi. According to Kan, The Lagos Review was started because he "wanted something that is a bit more magazine-like" after exiting The Sun as the art writer.

References

External links 

2019 establishments in Nigeria
Magazines established in 2019
Online literary magazines
Online magazines published in Nigeria